2PL may refer to:

 Two-phase locking, a concurrency control locking protocol in databases and transaction processing
 the glossing abbreviation for second person, plural